Nowe Miasto is a town in Płońsk County, Masovian Voivodeship, in east-central Poland. It is the seat of the gmina (administrative district) called Gmina Nowe Miasto.

The town has a population of 2,000. Its name means "new town".

References

External links
 Jewish Community in Nowe Miasto on Virtual Shtetl

Cities and towns in Masovian Voivodeship
Płońsk County